Phil Venables may refer to:
 Philip Venables, British composer
 Phil Venables (computer scientist), chief information security officer at Google Cloud